Wallatiri (Aymara wallata snow ball, snow lump; Andean goose, -(i)ri a suffix, translated as "abundance of Andean geese" or "habitat of the Andean geese", Hispanicized spelling Huallatiri) is a mountain in the Andes of Bolivia, about  high. It is located in the La Paz Department, Pacajes Province, Calacoto Municipality.

References 

Mountains of La Paz Department (Bolivia)